Alocasia cuprea is a species of plant in the genus Alocasia native to Borneo. This species derives its name, cuprea, from the unusual coppery appearance of the leaves, which are up to 24 inches long. This color is especially pronounced on juvenile leaves, and the back of the leaf is a deep purple, but there is also a greener leaf form of the plant. While rare in cultivation, A. cuprea has been known outside its native habitat since it was brought to Europe in the 1850s by Thomas Lobb for Veitch Nurseries.

References 

cuprea
Flora of Borneo
Plants described in 1861